Fabio Alberto León Bentley Airport  is an airport serving Mitú in the  Vaupés Department of Colombia. It is next to the Vaupés River and runs along the entire length of the city.

It has an asphalt runway sufficient for medium-sized passenger jets and military transport aircraft. The passenger terminal is small but functional, with one or two shops and a cafeteria. All visitors to Mitú must register with the police at the airport upon arrival and departure.

The Mitu VOR-DME (Ident: MTU) and non-directional beacon (Ident: MTU) are located on the field.

Airlines and destinations

Accidents and incidents 
On 17 February 1977, Douglas C-47B FAC-1125 of SATENA was damaged beyond economic repair in a take-off accident. All 28 people on board survived.
On 5 May 2010, SATENA Flight 9634, an Embraer ERJ-145 overran the runway. The aircraft crashed through the airport fence and then came to rest in a field, suffering substantial damage. None of the 37 passengers and 4 crew were injured or killed. The runway at the time of the accident was wet as it had recently rained in the area.

See also
Transport in Colombia
List of airports in Colombia

References

External links
OpenStreetMap - Mitú
OurAirports - Mitú
SkyVector - Mitú

Airports in Colombia
Buildings and structures in Vaupés Department